Grace Dieu Halt railway station was a station on the Charnwood Forest Railway. At 52.761485°N  1.354311°E near the hamlet of Grace-Dieu, Leicestershire. On the outskirts of Whitwick.

The station closed in 1931 when passenger services on the line with withdrawn. Today, nothing remains of the halt and the trackbed is now a footpath. Nearby is also Grace Dieu Priory and Manor School, which were served by the halt.

References

Disused railway stations in Leicestershire
Former London and North Western Railway stations
Railway stations in Great Britain opened in 1907
Railway stations in Great Britain closed in 1931